Sangala Palli is a village in Kadapa district in the state of Andhra Pradesh in India. It is 60 km west of the city of Kadapa.

References

Villages in Kadapa district